Dibrova is a village in Ternopil Raion, Ternopil Oblast, Ukraine. It belongs to Saranchuky rural hromada, one of the hromadas of Ukraine.

Until 18 July 2020, Dibrova belonged to Berezhany Raion. The raion was abolished in July 2020 as part of the administrative reform of Ukraine, which reduced the number of raions of Ternopil Oblast to three. The area of Berezhany Raion was merged into Ternopil Raion.

References

Sources

Villages in Ternopil Raion
Saranchuky rural hromada